Cherbourg is an ancient town in France. Cherbourg may also refer to:

Cherbourg-en-Cotentin, a commune and city, formed in 2016, in the French department Manche
Cherbourg Harbour
Cherbourg Naval Base
Cherbourg-Octeville, a former French commune, formed in 1960 and merged into Cherbourg-en-Cotentin in 2016
Cherbourg peninsula
Cherbourg, Queensland, Australia, a town

See also 
 Cherbourg – Maupertus Airport
 Battle of Cherbourg (June 1944)
 Raid on Cherbourg (1758)
 The Umbrellas of Cherbourg, a French film directed by Jacques Demy (1964)